Iah (also Yah, Jah or Aah = "Moon") was a king's mother and queen of ancient Egypt c. 2060 BC, during the mid 11th Dynasty (2134–1991 BC). Daughter of a pharaoh, possibly Intef II, and mother of pharaoh Mentuhotep II, she was the queen of Intef III.

Biography
Little is known for certain about the origin and life of Iah. She bore the title of king's daughter (S3t-nswt), which indicates that she was the daughter of pharaoh, possibly Intef II, but this remains conjectural. Her name is a reference to Iah, an Egyptian Moon god.

Iah was married to pharaoh Intef III, although the important title king's wife is not attested for her. Their children were:
Pharaoh Nebhepetre Mentuhotep II (2046 BC – 1995 BC)
Queen Neferu II
As the mother of Mentuhotep II and Neferu II, Iah was both the maternal and paternal grandmother of king Mentuhotep III.

Iah appears on a rock relief in the Shatt er-Rigal where she is shown standing behind Mentuhotep II. In front of both of them are depicted the beloved god's father, son of Ra, Intef and the royal sealer and treasurer Kheti. She also appears in the tomb TT319 of her daughter Neferu II. She is named on relief fragments of Neferu's tomb and on model coffins, where it is written: "Neferu, born of Iah".

Titles 
Beloved King’s Mother (mwt-nswt mryt-f)
Priestess of Hathor (ḥmt-nṯr-ḥwt-ḥr)
King's daughter (sȝt-nswt)

References

Queens consort of the Eleventh Dynasty of Egypt
Rock reliefs in Egypt